Lincoln Brewster is the self-titled debut Christian worship music album by Lincoln Brewster released on April 21, 1999 by Vertical Music.

Track listing 
All tracks composed by Lincoln Brewster; except where indicated
"He's All I Need"
"Everybody Praise the Lord" 
"Hey God" - (Brewster, Daniel Rhinehart)
"What Kind of Man" 
"Can't Deny" 
"Spin" 
"Shine" 
"On My Way" 
"Broken" 
"Walk On"

Personnel
Lincoln Brewster - Guitars, mandolin, keyboard, bass on "What Kind of Man," lead and background vocals
"Q" - Drums and percussion
Craig Young - Bass
Blair Masters - B3 organ, keyboard
Jimmy Sloas - Bass on "Hey God" and "Walk On"
Raymond Boyd - Percussion
Paul Mills - Keyboard
Gang vocals on "Everybody Praise the Lord" - Lincoln Brewster, Darrel Corlew, David DeMarco, C.J. Hattlevig

References

1999 debut albums
Lincoln Brewster albums